Zodiac Clothing Company Ltd. (ZCCL or ZODIAC /ˈzəʊdiˌæk/) is a manufacturer of men's clothing that owns the ZODIAC, ZOD! and z3 brands. The company produces men's apparel and accessories for Indian and International markets. It was started as ‘House of Zodiac’ in by M. Y. Noorani in 1954 as a necktie manufacturer. ZCCL was incorporated as a private limited company in 1984. ZCCL was listed as a public limited company in 1994.

As of 2018, Zodiac Clothing Company Ltd. has been following a company-owned model for its retail chain of 121 stores, with more than 2,100 direct on-roll employees and 1,500 independent retailers.

History 
In 1984, Zodiac Clothing Company (ZCCL) was incorporated as a private limited company. It became a deemed public limited company in December 1993 and went public in January 1994.

Mergers and acquisitions 

In 1992, Zodiac Textiles & Apparels Export Pvt. Ltd. (ZTAEPL), Multiplex Packaging Pvt. Ltd. (MPPL), and Bangalore-based Knitwear Pvt. Ltd. (BKPL) amalgamated with ZCCL. In 2004, ZCCL acquired a Dubai-based shirt manufacturing company for close to INR 25 crore.

Marketing 
In 1960, Ulka Kolkata, an advertising agency launched “The Zodiac Man” campaign for the marketing of ZODIAC's shirt and tie business. Dhanji Rana, the creative director of the agency, became the face of the marketing material design for the campaign. The campaign found considerable success in India, strongly placing ZODIAC in the men's formal and casual wear segments. It was also critically acclaimed by the famous novelist, Khushwant Singh.

Brands 
Zodiac Clothing Company retails its products through three brands: ZODIAC (men's formal wear), and ZOD! Club Wear and z3 (relaxed casual wear).

ZODIAC 
Zodiac or ZODIAC brand is ZCCL's primary market face. ZCCL markets and sells formal shirts, trousers, and ties for men. The brand's main target audience is men over the age of 35. Zodiac is among the very first formal ready-to-wear brands in India.

ZOD! 

ZOD! the second brand of ZCCL, was launched in 2002. ZOD! primarily offers casual men's shirts and party wear that are targeted toward young adults. The brand's descriptive indicator was chosen as “Club Wear” targeting active party goers, as well as nightclub and disco enthusiasts.

The brand was strategically placed in the segment to narrow it down from the broader classification of “casual wear”, due to the growing popularity of nightclubs during the time. The brand was launched with the slogan, “ZOD! - Are you game?”.

z3 
z3 is ZCCL's third brand, which was launched in 2008. z3 included shirts, braided belts, and socks targeting the youth segment. z3 was positioned as a youth-centered, casual wear brand. It features pre-washed cloths, made in Egyptian cotton with a "Trademark Vintage Wash".

References

Clothing manufacturers